Milton Barnes may refer to:

Milton Barnes (actor), Canadian television and film actor
Milton Barnes (basketball) (born 1957), American basketball player
Milton Barnes (composer) (1931–2001), Canadian classical music composer
Milton Barnes (politician) (1830–1895), Ohio Secretary of State in the 1870s